Dwight is a fictional character in the comic book series The Walking Dead and is portrayed by Austin Amelio in the American television series of the same name and its companion series Fear the Walking Dead.

In the comic book series, Dwight is second-in-command to a group of survivors led by Negan called "The Saviors" who extort nearby communities for their supplies in exchange for protection against zombies. Dwight despises Negan for using his wife Sherry as a concubine, and becomes an uneasy ally of Rick Grimes as an informant against Negan. After Negan's defeat, Dwight becomes the new leader of the Saviors and incorporates them into the trade-route arrangement between the other communities.

In the television series, Dwight, Sherry and her sister, Tina, flee the Saviors, fed up with Negan's reign of terror. They encounter Daryl Dixon, who helps them escape, but Dwight betrays Daryl, stealing his crossbow and his motorcycle. Since then, a rivalry has been formed between Dwight and Daryl. Following Sherry's disappearance, Dwight betrays Negan and works with Rick as an informant against the Saviors. After the war, Dwight is exiled by Daryl and leaves to go and find Sherry.

In January 2019, it was announced that Amelio will reprise his role as Dwight in the fifth season of Fear the Walking Dead which began airing on June 2, 2019. In the spin-off series, Dwight joins Morgan's convoy and is searching for Sherry, whom he has chased across the country.

Appearances

Comic book series
Before the outbreak, Dwight served in the military and was married to Sherry, and was possibly a hunter due to his accuracy with a crossbow. After the outbreak occurred Dwight and Sherry took up residence in the Sanctuary community led by Negan, but Dwight and Sherry struggled to maintain their keep due to Negan's high expectations. However, Negan offered Dwight and Sherry easier lives if Sherry became one of his many wives; she reluctantly agreed though this would mean that Dwight would never be allowed to so much as speak to her again. One night they violated their agreement and Negan had Dwight's face burned with an iron as punishment, and from then on Dwight pretended to hate Sherry, openly calling her bitch, to make her think he did hate her although he resented himself for doing so. Eventually, Dwight joined Negan's army of "zombie exterminators" offering protection to the nearby Hilltop Colony and The Kingdom communities in exchange for half of their supplies weekly, threatening them with violence if they didn't comply, and Dwight served as Negan's right-hand man.

Something to Fear
After Rick Grimes kills several Saviors, refusing to partake in their arrangement, Dwight is sent by Negan to make an example of those who refuse him. After finding Rick's home in the Alexandria Safe-Zone, Dwight attempts a failed ambush against them and is injured. In retaliation, Negan himself goes after Rick while he travels to Hilltop and sends Dwight and 50 other Saviors back to attack Alexandria but Andrea is able to kill at least a dozen of them and forced the rest to retreat, but Dwight is captured and held in the underground bunker. Rosita wants to kill Dwight for murdering Abraham and almost killing Eugene but Rick plans to consent to Negan's terms and releases Dwight so he won't anger Negan anymore than he already has. As Dwight leaves however it's revealed that Rick has tasked Jesus to follow Dwight back to his community.

What Comes After
As Dwight walks back home he notices movement on the bridge above him but fails to see Jesus following him and shrugs it off but another Savior crosses his path and informs Dwight he's been followed, but is informed that John and Tara have captured Jesus. Despite resistance, Tara manages to have him restrained and Dwight demands Jesus to be taken back alive and throw him into their truck but as they approach the Sanctuary Jesus manages to escape unnoticed. Dwight demands the other saviors not to tell Negan and Dwight is present for Negan's return from Alexandria much to Negan's surprise as he'd believed him killed in the Alexandria and expresses disappointment that he isn't dead, much to Dwight's anger. When Carl Grimes attacks them having snuck aboard the truck Dwight viciously beats the child in anger until Negan stops him, having taken a liking to Carl earlier, and later Dwight witnesses Negan ironing Mark's face for sleeping with Amber who is now married to Negan and looks on with sympathy. When Amber tries to reach out to Mark, Dwight stops her and Sherry comforts her but as she tries to talk to Dwight he calls her a bitch and tells her to shut up but as Sherry walks away heart-broken Dwight appears engulfed in rage. Dwight later witnesses Negan's ping-pong tournament and afterward deliberately drags Sherry away to have sex with in front of Dwight. Finally having enough Dwight approaches Ezekiel of The Kingdom and offers his assistance against Negan and Ezekiel contacts Rick and Jesus to meet with them, but Rick immediately distrusts him for killing Abraham but Dwight is surprised to see Rick show up at all as he assumed he'd fallen victim to Negan's intimidation. Rick doesn't believe Dwight to be a defector and tries to convince Ezekiel that Dwight is a spy who's trying to uncover their plan to rebel against Negan, but Dwight informs Rick about Sherry and that Negan would have killed her if he didn't kill Abraham but Rick eventually punches Dwight in the face. After Ezekiel stops them coming to further blows Dwight explains that Sherry chose to become Negan's wife in order to make their lives easier, and they didn't realize how much they needed each other until then and the one time they were caught together is when Negan burnt his face. Dwight admits he committed terrible acts for Negan he can't make up for out of cowardice but insists he can help the leaders end Negan's reign of terror and offers them everything he knows about Negan, even if Rick doesn't trust him he asks to trust that his information will see Negan dead.

All Out War
After the militia of the communities led by Rick, Maggie and Ezekiel attacks the Sanctuary Negan orders Dwight to rally a counterattack and agrees but deliberately hesitates to give Rick more time to, as planned, kill enough Saviors and to lure any zombies nearby. Though the plan succeeds Holly is captured by Negan who he believes is Rick's girlfriend, unaware it's Andrea he actually needs, but she reminds him she was with Abraham and looks at Dwight with disdain. Dwight later helps Negan and some other saviors clear out zombies trying to get into the Sanctuary and later, reluctantly, takes part in Negan's counterattack on Alexandria. First using a zombified Holly as a Trojan horse which kills Denise Cloyd and then begins throwing grenades into the safe-zone but orders the saviors to spread out, since they will be easier targets. After Jesus manages to toss one of the grenades back Dwight tells a group of saviors to hold the grenades longer so they can't be tossed back but as they start panicking Dwight grows tired and shoots them all. Jesus sees this and still acts suspicious of Dwight but he again insists he is on their side. Dwight is later present with Negan and Carson after Eugene is captured and demands Eugene start building bullets for them rather than Rick but he refuses. After Negan and Carson leave Dwight sneaks back into Eugene's cell and tries to convince him of his arrangement with Rick so Eugene doesn't give into Negan's demands but Eugene doesn't believe him and accuses him of playing both sides and that if he had defected he would have put a knife through Negan's head while asleep, but Dwight insists that he is going to kill Negan when the time is right and not when there are too many people who'd kill him for his betrayal. Before he can continue both men notice Carson watching them but shows support for Dwight's actions as he desires to get back to Hilltop to be with his brother Harlan Carson, and that others are against Negan too. Negan later orders all his men to soak their bladed weapons and arrow heads in zombie corpses so anyone stabbed, regardless if they survive will be killed by the infection. After forcing the Alexandria and Kingdom residents back to Hilltop Negan launches an attack on the colony where Dwight is forced to kill some members of the communities but after sneaking up on Rick, Negan orders Dwight to kill Rick. Although he hesitates Dwight shoots Rick in his lower back but Dwight secretly switches one of his zombie coated arrowheads for a normal one so Rick won't be infected. After falling back Negan camps close to Hilltop and Dwight joins him near a fireplace where Negan is happy with excitement, believing Dwight shot Rick with an infected arrow, and believes Rick will be dead soon and the militia crippled. The next day the saviors line up outside Hilltop's gates where Rick alone emerges to talk to Negan, enraged that Dwight didn't kill him, and he manages to deceive Negan with talks of consenting to the arrangement before slitting his throat. As Rick and Negan fight Dwight orders the saviors to stay back allowing the other community members to open fire on them and Dwight drops his cover and begins firing on other saviors, even saving Ezekiel from one. After Negan passes out from blood loss and Rick from exhaustion Dwight reveals his alliance with Rick to the community members, and declares himself the new leader of the saviors and orders them to stand down. Though resistant Dwight insists they don't have to fear Negan anymore and can live peacefully with the other communities and they consent to his leadership.

Life and Death
In the two years since Negan's defeat Dwight has incorporated the Saviors into the trade-route arrangement with the communities but has become stressed with the heavy burdens of leadership, and he and Sherry have divorced but still remain close friends. When delivering a share of supplies from the Sanctuary to Alexandria Dwight approaches Rick and asks to speak to him and confesses that it was necessary for him to take leadership during the war, but feels unfit to lead anymore. Rick tells him to discuss it with the residents of the Sanctuary and hold an election.

No Turning Back
After 12 members of all 4 communities are murdered by The Whisperers the Saviors head back to the Sanctuary but Laura suggests Dwight stay behind and assist Rick, but he confides in her that he doesn't want to be leader anymore, but Laura insists that his people need him now more than ever and can't quit.

Television series
After the outbreak occurred, Dwight, Sherry and her sister-in-law Tina and two teenagers named Carla and Delly were forced into the forest to escape a large group of walkers, but Carla and Delly were separated from them. Sherry set fire to the forest to kill all the walkers within it but this indirectly resulted in Carla and Delly's deaths. The three later came into contact with The Saviors led by Negan, a group of survivors who extorted other communities into giving them supplies by force and were offered protection in exchange for their service which they agreed, but came to see that Negan was a tyrant. They eventually grew resentful of "kneeling" and the three, along with a truck full of supplies named Patty, escaped from the community. However, men were sent to find the four and ambushed them on a road 20 miles away from the Alexandria Safe-Zone, and were separated from Patty.

Season 6

In the episode "Always Accountable", Dwight and his fellow Saviors Sherry (Christine Evangelista) and Tina (Liz Morgan) ambush Daryl Dixon (Norman Reedus), mistaking him for part of the group they just left, and Dwight threatens to kill him if he tries anything. Daryl tries to convince Dwight he is not who they think he is but they do not believe him. They tell Daryl they are not going back to the community, and Daryl is their insurance in case they are found while they look for a fuel truck. Eventually they find an abandoned factory overrun with walkers and deduce that the truck must have been taken. Tina faints and Daryl steals their supplies and runs, but after learning Tina is diabetic he returns with the supplies. Shortly after a group led by Dwight tells Wade he is not going back but Wade demands he and the girls give back everything they took. Daryl helps them escape, and lures another man, Cam (Matt Lowe), into a walker trapped in a tree that bites his arm. After Wade amputates he is called off and they return to their home and Dwight realizes Daryl is not with the group. They find a greenhouse where they find out that Delly and Carla were killed, but the two girls emerge as walkers and kill Tina. As Dwight and Daryl bury them, Daryl invites Dwight and Sherry to come back to Alexandria. On impulse, he holds Daryl at gunpoint and demands his crossbow which he reluctantly hands over. Dwight and Sherry also take his bike and leave him behind, and Sherry says she is sorry, but Daryl simply says "you're gonna be".

Dwight returns in the episode "Twice as Far", sporting burn scars on the right side of his face. While Daryl, Rosita Espinosa (Christian Serratos), and Denise Cloyd (Merritt Wever) are on a supply run, Dwight shoots Denise through the back of the head with Daryl's crossbow and emerges with a group of Saviors and the captured Eugene Porter (Josh McDermitt). Dwight then demands that Daryl and Rosita take him and his Saviors back to their home base, but they refuse. Daryl then coldly tells Dwight that he should have killed him back in the burned forest. Suddenly, Eugene bites Dwight's testicles and Abraham Ford (Michael Cudlitz) emerges from the bushes and kills many of Dwight's Saviors, resulting in a firefight between Daryl's group and Dwight's group. However, Dwight and the Saviors manage to escape. In the episode "East", Daryl leaves Alexandria to avenge Denise's death and kill Dwight, but Rosita, Glenn Rhee (Steven Yeun), and Michonne (Danai Gurira) chase after him to stop him. While Glenn and Michonne are separated from Daryl and Rosita they are ambushed by Dwight and captured and used as bait to lure Daryl and Rosita out. As Daryl realizes the deception, Dwight appears and shoots him in the back but says "You'll be alright". In the season finale "Last Day on Earth", Dwight brings Daryl, Michonne, Glenn and Rosita into the middle of a route between Alexandria and Hilltop, where Saviors leader Negan (Jeffrey Dean Morgan) has Rick Grimes (Andrew Lincoln), Carl Grimes (Chandler Riggs), Maggie Greene (Lauren Cohan), Abraham, Sasha Williams (Sonequa Martin-Green), Eugene, and Aaron (Ross Marquand). As Negan addresses the group for the recent attacks on his people, he considers killing Maggie, provoking Glenn into charging him, and Dwight tackles him and threatens to kill him if he tries it again. Dwight then watches as Negan kills Abraham.

Season 7

In the season premiere, "The Day Will Come When You Won't Be", Dwight witnesses Negan kill Abraham, who was in the line-up captured by the Saviors in the woods. When an enraged Daryl attacks Negan, Dwight stops him and asks Negan if he should kill him. Negan spares Daryl, wanting to convert him to his cause, and so kills Glenn instead. Negan orders Dwight to throw Daryl into a van, and Negan and the Saviors leave, but issue a warning that they will show up at the Alexandria Safe-Zone in one week to collect their debt.

The episode "The Cell", shows Dwight on an average day in the Sanctuary as he watches television, plays ping pong and makes an elaborate sandwich from the Sanctuary garden, showing his high position with the Saviors. He is later shown giving Daryl rotten food in his cell while tormenting him with loud music at night to stop him from getting any sleep. It is shown that Negan is tasking Dwight with breaking Daryl so he can become one of them. He then offers Dwight the chance to sleep with Sherry or any of Negan's other "wives", but Dwight turns him down. Shortly after, Dwight volunteers to bring back a runaway Savior named Gordon (Michael Scialabba) to try to impress Negan, but his motorcycle is damaged after an encounter with walkers near an overpass. Once he finds Gordon, he tells him to keep walking back towards the Sanctuary, but after Gordon begs him not to take him back, Dwight shoots him in an act of mercy. Negan later reveals to Daryl that Dwight, his wife Sherry and her sister Tina ran away with medical supplies before returning. Negan was going to kill Dwight, but Sherry offered to marry him if he spared Dwight's life. While Dwight was allowed to live and return to the Saviors, his face was burned with an iron as punishment. When Daryl still refuses to submit, Dwight throws him back in his cell, telling him he will either end up working for Negan or on the walker fence. Daryl responds with telling Dwight he understands why he knelt, as he was thinking about someone else - which is why he, Daryl, cannot kneel. The episode ends with Dwight staring at the reanimated Gordon on the fence.

In the episode "Service", Dwight shows up with the Saviors at the Alexandria Safe-Zone for tribute. While his people gathered up the offerings, Dwight demanded Rosita give him Daryl's motorcycle, though he later tells Daryl it is his whenever he wants; he just has to say the word.

Dwight later reappears in "Sing Me a Song" when Carl arrives at the Sanctuary to kill Negan. Dwight disarms Carl and holds him at gunpoint, but Negan admonishes him for treating a guest that way. He is later seen while Negan is with Sherry and watches with visible discomfort when Negan burns a Savior named Mark (Griffin Freeman) who broke the rules. He is later shown discussing with Sherry how she gave up Mark. Sherry denies that's what happened before Dwight dismisses her by saying, "Whatever helps you sleep." When she asks him how he sleeps, he responds that he does not. When she remarks that their return to the Saviors was only supposed to affect them, Dwight disagrees, stating "If you're still standing in this world, it's on someone else's back" before she departs. 

In "Hostiles and Calamities", Dwight discovers that Daryl is gone and quickly finds a note written to Daryl. He is then attacked by several Saviors on Negan's orders and find himself back in a cell. Negan later informs him that Sherry is gone and asks him if he is loyal. When Dwight professes his innocence, Negan allows him to go after Sherry. He then goes to a house that they promised to meet at if they got separated and finds a note apologizing to him for everything that has happened and saying goodbye. He is distraught by her absence, but hangs on to her ring and leaves a message for her there. He returns to the Sanctuary and plants the note in Dr. Emmett Carson's (Tim Parati) office. Negan kills Carson, believing he let Daryl go, before apologizing to Dwight for doubting him. The episode ends with Dwight conversing with Eugene as the two acknowledge that they are still themselves, not Negan. 

Near the end of the episode "The Other Side", it is revealed that the dark shadow is Dwight, who is seen outside the Shrine with Daryl's crossbow, watching Rosita from afar. At the end of the episode "Something They Need", it is revealed Dwight found Rosita outside the Sanctuary and she brought him back to Alexandria. He is placed in a cell until Rick arrives. Daryl attempts to attack him, but Rosita claims he wants to help, something he confirms to Rick.  

"The First Day of the Rest of Your Life" opens with Rick holding Dwight at gunpoint; Denise's girlfriend Tara Chambler (Alanna Masterson), wanting revenge, advocates killing him. Dwight claims he did not intend to kill her, before being pinned against a wall by Daryl, who holds a knife to his eye. Dwight apologizes to Daryl for torturing him, and claims that he can help them beat Negan. After Daryl releases him, Dwight reveals that Negan is coming to Alexandria the next day with a convoy of Saviors. He states he can slow them down so they can prepare; once they kill Negan and those with them, Dwight can lead them back to the Sanctuary and they can take over, putting an end to the threat. He leaves Alexandria and saws down several trees to blockade the path between Alexandria and the Sanctuary. The next day, Dwight is forced to watch things devolve into all-out battle between Rick's allies and the Saviors. After the Saviors retreat, Daryl finds a message from Dwight, claiming he did not know that would happen.

Season 8

Dwight appears in the season premiere "Mercy," when Daryl sneaks him a message informing him of their upcoming attack. Dwight responds with passing Daryl information revealing the location of the Saviors compounds and patrols as well as the number of Savior stationed at them. This info proves to be critical to Rick's plan to take control of all Savior outposts. In the episode "The Big Scary U", Dwight appears in a flashback, with Simon (Steven Ogg), Gregory (Xander Berkeley), Negan and his lieutenant Saviors, reaching an agreement to stop Rick and his allies. 

The meeting is divided by the beginning of the attack of Rick's militia in the Sanctuary, when Gavin raises the possibility that the militia attack may have succeeded due to the internal information of one of them. Dwight, who had provided Rick with that information, diverts the discussion to problems with anxious workers downstairs, knowing that if they do not assert a form of authority, they could rebel. Leaving things for the moment, they return to their rooms. Eugene comes to Dwight's room to give him a thank-you gift and notices a freshly painted chess set in his room, while the Saviors discover bags of arms left by the militia and evidence that they were stolen and used by an infiltrated Savior Rick's allies. Eugene discovers a paint stain in a bag, the same color as Dwight's chess set. 

In the episode "Time for After", Dwight confronts Eugene in his room and lets him know that he is aware of his involvement in Rick's plan. Dwight holds Eugene at gunpoint on the roof, reminding him that Negan will look for Rick and his friends if he continues with this. Eugene decides to throw anyway, but Dwight shoots the drone carrying an iPod before it can attract the walkers. At that time, Daryl drives the truck toward the walls of the Sanctuary, allowing walkers to flood the lower floors of the Sanctuary. Many of the workers are killed, but Negan's lieutenants lead an assault to keep hikers at bay. Eugene tells Alexandria's chaplain Gabriel Stokes (Seth Gilliam) that he will do what keeps him alive and that he will remain loyal to Negan. Then he goes to see Negan, preparing to inform him that Dwight is Rick's double agent, but Dwight and fellow Savior Regina (Traci Dinwiddie) arrive suddenly, and Eugene remains silent. 

In the mid-season finale "How It's Gotta Be", Dwight directly assists the Militia against the Saviors by helping the residents of Alexandria escape as their town is destroyed. Dwight later leads some of the Saviors into an ambush in which he is wounded in the arm by a Savior named Laura (Lindsley Register), who escapes to warn the Saviors of Dwight's betrayal. Following the ambush, Dwight convinces Daryl, Rosita and Tara that he wants Negan dead and can still be of use, promising that they can settle their differences later. Dwight joins the survivors of Alexandria in the sewers and expresses grief at the destruction of the town.

In the mid-season premiere "Honor", as the Savior bombardment of Alexandria continues, a desperate Michonne demands that Dwight call the Saviors off, but he cannot. As everyone argues about what to do, Dwight tells them to remain hidden in the sewers until the attack ends. Dwight explains that the Saviors lack the ammunition to fully destroy the town and will have to stop soon at which point they can head for the Hilltop. After the attack ends, Dwight departs for the Hilltop with the Alexandrians. 

In the episode "Dead or Alive Or", when the group is on their way to Hilltop, Dwight is accepted by the group, albeit reluctantly by Daryl. Dwight suggests going through a swamp that he knows the Saviors will not follow them into. Dwight's plan is accepted with reluctance, and Dwight says he accepts that they will likely kill him after the war; he says he only wants to help them defeat Negan and find Sherry. Dwight also apologizes to Tara for killing Denise. When Tara is later captured by the Saviors, she does not tell them where he is. 

Dwight deflects the Saviors and returns to the Sanctuary without problems. Later, Dwight is among the Saviors at the Sanctuary listening to Negan's new plan. Dwight is visibly worried for the members of the Militia and sends over a copy of Negan's plan on a map over to the Hilltop, using Gregory to deliver it. Simon recruits Dwight and a few other Saviors to overthrow Negan, but Dwight sells out Simon by informing Negan of his planned mutiny. Negan has Simon's men killed and fights Simon hand-to-hand, killing him. Dwight's treacherous actions against the Saviors are exposed when Negan reveals that he picked up Laura the night before and she told him about Dwight's betrayal in Alexandria. It is then revealed that Negan tricked Dwight by having him give that intelligence to Rick's group, which was actually a fake plan designed to lead the Militia into a trap.

In the eighth season finale "Wrath", Dwight is now a prisoner. During the ambush against the Militia, Dwight is forced to watch as Negan plans to eliminate everybody with bullets that Eugene manufactured. However, it is revealed that Eugene sabotaged the bullets and caused them to explode in the Saviors' hands. Dwight seizes an opportunity to attack Negan when he is injured, but Negan throws him down and runs away. After Rick defeats Negan and the other Saviors surrender, Daryl takes Dwight out into the woods, intent on killing him. As Dwight accepts his fate, he begins to cry on his knees. Daryl takes pity on him and hands him keys to a truck, telling him to go find Sherry; he also warns Dwight that they will kill him if he ever returns. Dwight drives over to his and Sherry's old house, where he finds a note from her that simply reads, "Honeymoon". Dwight smiles.

Fear the Walking Dead

Season 5

In "Humbug's Gulch," Dwight attacks John (Garret Dillahunt) and June Dorie (Jenna Elfman), chasing them to a ghost town. It is revealed that Dwight has been searching for Sherry for a year since he left Virginia, following notes from Sherry who seems to be on the run from somebody. After the situation is defused, Dwight, John and June work together to escape a herd, but Dwight doubles back to check their car where he expects to find the latest note from Sherry. After it turns out to be a dead end, Dwight, remorseful for his actions, contemplates suicide while surrounded by a herd of walkers. June talks Dwight out of it and the three work together to take out the walkers. That night, as Dwight inscribes a message that he is still looking on a wall, John approaches him and reveals that he has discovered that Dwight was checking the wrong car. As a result, Sherry may still be out there and left Dwight a note in the right car with John reassuring Dwight he knows what he's talking about due to his past as a police officer. Shortly afterwards, Dwight is reunited with Morgan Jones (Lennie James) and the two men exchange easy banter, Morgan putting their past behind them. Dwight leads the group to the largest walker blockade yet, but their plan to take it out is derailed by a message from Max (Ethan Suess), leading them to find Dylan (Cooper Dodson) covered in blood in a van surrounded by walker guts. Dwight later continues his search with John, who finds a message from Sherry telling Dwight to stop searching for her as she doesn't want him to get hurt. John eventually tells Dwight the truth and he refuses to give up hope, but decides to join Morgan's group and rededicate himself to helping others in need to make up for his past.

In the second half of the season, Dwight is a member of Morgan's convoy. He takes part in the group's documentary, telling people about his search for his wife. While on a mission to answer a call for help Morgan, Dwight, and Grace (Karen David) discover a mall. Inside the mall appears to look just as before the time of the walkers, including food and an infirmary. In hopes to make it a new home and get the rest of the group, Dwight agrees to distract Logan's (Matt Frewer) group from the location. He calls out on an open channel the direction he's traveling. Dwight is taken as hostage by a member of Logan's group who was listening on that channel. When the group encounters Virginia (Colby Minifie) and her larger group, Virginia offers to use her large network to find out about Sherry for Dwight as incentive for him to join her, but he refuses. Virginia later reveals to Dwight that she did look as she promised and she found an engineer who claimed to have broken bread with Sherry only a few months before. According to the engineer, Sherry is extremely worried about Dwight. When Dwight expresses skepticism at Virginia's claims, Virginia points out that she knows Sherry's name as proof as Dwight had never called Sherry by name during the documentary. Dwight continues to refuse to join Virginia and later walks off when Morgan feels they have no choice but to call Virginia for help. After hearing a hallucination of Sherry's voice and finding some horses, Dwight returns and helps to deal with the herd at Humbug's Gulch. During John and June's wedding, Dwight gives them his and Sherry's wedding rings. Like the rest of Morgan's group, he is taken by Virginia and split up amongst her communities.

Season 6

In "Alaska" Dwight goes with Althea on a mission assigned by Virginia, during the process of this mission, Dwight manages to find Sherry's whereabouts. They soon part ways once again, after Sherry becomes insecure.

In "J.D.," Sherry reveals that she intends to return to Virginia in order to kill Negan in revenge for his actions towards her. While initially reluctant, Dwight agrees to help Sherry begin her journey east again, but they help June and John Dorie Sr. with their attempt to get answers from Hill first. During this time, the two reminisce on happier times in their marriage. Sherry ends up choosing to give up on revenge and she and Dwight agree to start anew. June returns Dwight and Sherry's wedding rings to them as she no longer needs them.

In "The Beginning," Dwight and Sherry seek shelter from the coming destruction with the Larson family. Together, the two take out a couple of doomsday cultists that have forced the family out of their storm shelter. Tired of letting the bad guys win, Dwight cripples one of the bad guys and leaves him to die in the coming destruction. Hiding out in the storm shelter, Dwight and Sherry survive a nuclear shockwave that destroys the house.

Season 7

In "Till Death," Dwight and Sherry are revealed to have become a team of "ethical outlaws" known as the Dark Horses. The two respond to distress calls and help those in need while also searching for the mysterious Padre. Victor Strand attempts to enlist their help to find Mickey, a woman who had escaped his tower, in exchange for a place in the Tower for themselves, but they both refuse, negatively comparing Strand and the Tower to Negan and the Sanctuary. Nevertheless, the two decide to help Mickey who turns out to be one of Dwight's favorite wrestlers alongside her missing husband whom Mickey is searching for. Returning to the storm shelter, Dwight and Sherry are devastated to find out that the Larson family have been murdered, something that Dwight blames himself for. Dwight splits off from the other two, intending to take Strand's offer, but he discovers that Eli, a criminal that the Dark Horses had previously fought, was hired by Strand to murder the Larsons. Enraged, Dwight purposefully leaves Eli to be devoured by a herd and aids Sherry and Mickey in taking out a herd at Mickey's old wrestling gym. Afterwards, Dwight reveals to Sherry that he wants to have a family with her. Having discovered her husband undead, Mickey chooses to join the Dark Horses, only to have the Stalkers ambush the three and "invite" them to help the Stalkers to find Padre.

Development and reception
Dwight is portrayed by Austin Amelio on The Walking Dead television series.

Noel Murray of Rolling Stone ranked Dwight 22nd in a list of 30 best Walking Dead characters, saying, "The introduction of one of the comics' most important characters happened so stealthily (via what seemed at time like a one-off episode, last season's "Always Accountable") that even die-hard fans didn’t recognize that they'd just met the man who'll play such a major role in the Negan/Saviors storyline. Season Seven has fleshed Dwight (Austin Amelio) out a lot more, making his original appearance all the more tragic in retrospect."

References

Characters created by Robert Kirkman
Comics characters introduced in 2012
Fear the Walking Dead
Fictional American military personnel
Fictional archers
Fictional characters with disfigurements
Fictional double agents
Fictional mass murderers
Fictional zombie hunters
Image Comics male characters
The Walking Dead (franchise) characters